Ian Patrick Moran (born August 24, 1972) is an American former professional ice hockey defenseman. Throughout his 15-year professional career, Moran played for the Pittsburgh Penguins, Boston Bruins and Anaheim Ducks in the National Hockey League (NHL). He retired in 2008 after suffering a knee injury. Since 2017 he has served as the head scout and Director of Neutral Zone New England.

Moran was the head coach of the Evansville Thunderbolts in the Southern Professional Hockey League during the 2018–19 season.

Early life
Moran was born in Cleveland, Ohio on August 24, 1972, to parents Michael and Anita. He is the oldest of three children, having younger sisters Mary Pierce and Meghann. He found an interest in hockey at age 4 and began playing. As a youth, he played in the 1986 Quebec International Pee-Wee Hockey Tournament with a minor ice hockey team from New Haven, Connecticut.

After moving frequently as a kid, his family eventually settled in Acton, Massachusetts, a suburb of Boston. He attended high school at the Belmont Hill School. After graduating high school, Moran went to Boston College with a full ice hockey scholarship.

Playing career
Moran started his professional career with the Pittsburgh Penguins when he was drafted in the 6th round (107th overall) in the 1990 NHL Draft. He made his debut for the Penguins during their playoff run in the 1993–94 NHL season. In 433 career regular season games with the Penguins, Moran tallied 19 goals, 44 assists, and 281 penalty minutes in 433 games.  On March 11, 2003, Moran was traded to the Boston Bruins for a fourth round selection in 2003, which became Paul Bissonnette. Moran found out about the trade while playing hopscotch in his driveway with his daughter and ended up writing the phone number to the Bruins' general manager on his driveway in chalk.

During the 2004–05 NHL lockout, Moran had spells in the Sweden's HockeyAllsvenskan for Bofors IK and the United Kingdom's Elite Ice Hockey League for the Nottingham Panthers, however he was sidelined most of the year with a knee injury. Eventually, Moran signed with the Anaheim Ducks on August 15, 2006. Moran only played one game with the Ducks as he split the season with the American Hockey League with the Portland Pirates and then in the Deutsche Eishockey Liga for Eisbären Berlin in Germany.

After departing from Germany, Moran signed as an unrestricted free agent with the New Jersey Devils on July 24, 2007.  Moran played for the Devils’ minor league affiliate Lowell Devils and suffered another knee injury, and was never called up to play at the NHL level again.  By season's end, Moran became a free agent and ended his professional career.

Personal life
He resides in Duxbury, Massachusetts, with his wife Britta, and their four children; Mattigan (born 2000), Weston (born 2002), Luke (born 2004), and Leighton (born 2007). He currently owns and runs his own hockey skills business IM Hockey Skills out of Dedham, Massachusetts, as well as, since 2017, being the head New England scout for and director of Neutral Zone Ice (neutralzone.net).

Career statistics

Regular season and playoffs

International

Awards and honors

References

External links

1972 births
Living people
American men's ice hockey right wingers
Anaheim Ducks players
Bofors IK players
Boston Bruins players
Boston College Eagles men's ice hockey players
Cleveland Lumberjacks players
Eisbären Berlin players
Ice hockey players from Massachusetts
Ice hockey people from Cleveland
Lowell Devils players
Nottingham Panthers players
People from Acton, Massachusetts
Pittsburgh Penguins draft picks
Pittsburgh Penguins players
Portland Pirates players
Sportspeople from Middlesex County, Massachusetts
Belmont Hill School alumni